Rose in Vale Country House Hotel, in Mithian, Cornwall, England, UK, is a building of historical significance and is Grade II* listed on the English Heritage Register. It was originally a 17th-century Cornish longhouse that consisted of two cottages. In 1761 Mr Thomas Nankivell bought the property and added the Georgian frontage. It was the home of several prominent people over the next two hundred years. Today it is a hotel which provides accommodation and restaurant facilities and caters for special events, particularly weddings.

Early residents

Thomas Nankivell (1707-1777) who made substantial additions to the house in 1761, was a wealthy landowner. His Will revealed that he owned numerous properties. He was born in 1707, in St Agnes. His father was Benjamin Nankivell (1681-1759). He also owned a large number of properties some of which Thomas inherited when his father died in 1759. In 1738, Thomas married Mary Giddy (1711-1809), the daughter of John Giddy of Kea. The couple had ten children.

The family befriended the famous artist John Opie when he was young and encouraged him in his work. Out of gratitude for their assistance Opie painted Joyce Townsend who was one of their daughters. She was a local beauty who was said to possess “great sweetness and animation”.

Elizabeth who was another of Thomas’s daughters married in 1763 John James. Their son John James (1770-1719), who was a solicitor in Truro inherited Rose in Vale after his grandfather Thomas Nankivell died in 1777. The famous surveyor Sir Henry James who was his son was born at Rose in Vale in 1803.

In 1804, John advertised for sale all of his property. Rose in Vale was included in the advertisement and was described as a “dwelling house consisting of a drawing room, a dining room and parlour. Also a hall, kitchen, laundry and pantry with back kitchen and suitable offices and eight bedrooms. At this time the house was rented by the Rev James Bennetto and it was he who bought the property and lived there until his death in 1818.

The Rev James Bennetto (1752-1818) was born in 1752 in St Stephen-in-Brannel, Cornwall. He was educated at the University of Oxford and in 1793 was appointed as Vicar of Perranzabuloe and St Agnes. In 1795, he married Elizabeth Southerd (1770-1865). The couple had six children. In 1818 James died and the house was advertised for sale.

Captain John Oates (1768-1855) became the owner soon after this. He was living there by 1828, as his father’s burial notice records that he died aged 90 at Rose in Vale in 1828. Captain Oates was the owner of the Great Wheal Leisure Copper Mine at Perranporth. He was also involved in other mines. There is an account of how in the early 1830s Captain Oates and his co-adventurers sank a shaft at Wheal Leisure Mine and "upon the shaft was put a steam engine and water wheel to drain the lodes."

In 1796, he married Joan Cowlin (sometimes called Cowling). The couple had no children. John became very wealthy and purchased a large number of properties in the area. Because of his wealth he gave generously to the poor by setting up numerous funds to assist them. Joan died in 1850 and he died in 1855. As he had no children he left Rose in Vale to his wife’s nephew Richard Cowling.

Later residents

Richard Cowling (also called Cowlin) (1811-1879) was born in 1811 in Perranzabuloe. His father was Joan’s brother Edward Cowlin (1784-1850) of Gorran. In 1843 he married Ann Saunders (1812-1895) of Devon. However the couple had no children. He died in 1879 at Rose in Vale.

By 1900 the property was owned by Captain John Whitford (1858-1926), who was the manager of a gold mine in South Africa. He was born in 1858 in St Newlyn East, Cornwall and worked in several mines in the area. In 1881, he married Ann Searle Hooper (1859-1927) who was the daughter of Simon Hooper, a lead miner from Mithian. The couple had seven children. He spent much of their married life in South Africa while she reared the children in England. In about 1900 he bought Rose in Vale for his family. The 1901 Census shows his wife Ann living there with five of their younger children. In 1910 there was an article about his mining career in the English newspapers. By 1920 the couple were both living in Rose in Vale. He died in 1926 and she died in Truro in 1927.

The property began operating as a guesthouse early in the 20th century presumably during Captain Whitford's period of ownership and by 1910 was one of the very early properties to register with AA Hotel Services for the provision of accommodation.

By about 1930, Reuben and Annie Hoskin were the residents of Rose in Vale. Annie ran the property as a guest house and he farmed the property. Today the property still provides accommodation and is a venue for special events and exclusive weddings.

References

External links

Rose in Vale Country House Hotel website

Hotels in Cornwall